This is a list of monuments in Kathmandu Metropolis -6, officially recognized by and available through the website of the Department of Archaeology, Nepal in the Kathmandu District. Kathmandu is a historically-rich city and Hindu temples are the main attraction of the area. The monument list below is populated using the authentic information at Department of Archaeology.

List of monuments

|}

See also 
 List of monuments in Bagmati Zone
 List of monuments in Nepal

References 

Metropolis 06
Kathmandu-related lists